Chinese Optical Society (abbreviated COS) is a professional association of individuals with an interest in optics and photonics. It sponsored the Chinese Optics Letters, a monthly peer-reviewed scientific journal focusing on optics. As of 2019, the society has 21 specialized committees and 7 working committees with more than 15,000 individual members.

History
The Chinese Optical Society was established by Wang Daheng, Gong Zutong and Qian Linzhao on December 20, 1979. In 1987, it became a member of the International Commission for Optics (ICO).

Scientific publishing
 Chinese Optics Letters

List of presidents

References

External links

 

Physics societies
Optics institutions
Scientific organizations established in 1979
Organizations based in Beijing
1979 establishments in China